John Clarke, CM (February 25, 1945 – January 23, 2003) was a Canadian explorer, mountaineer, conservationist, and wilderness educator. He was born in Ireland to Brigit Ann Clarke (née Conway) and Thomas Kevin Clarke, and died in Vancouver, British Columbia of a brain tumor. From 1964 until his death in 2003 Clarke spent at least six months of each year on extended backcountry trips, usually into the Coast Mountains of British Columbia using the technique of dropping food caches from small planes along an intended route, then traveling that route for weeks at a time. His routes regularly led him along the high ridges and glaciated icefields of the west coast, and allowed him to make hundreds of first ascents of the many mountains along the way. Many of these trips exceeded 30 days in length, and were often done solo, simply because nobody could afford the time to accompany him.

Biography
Born in Ireland, Clarke moved to Canada with his parents at age 11, attending the Monastery School in Mission, British Columbia.

Some time in around 1964 Clarke began his forays into the Coast Mountains, and over the course of the next 39 years made an amazing 600 first ascents.

In 1994, during a multi-week traverse of the Kitlope region of the Coast Mountains, Randy Stoltmann, a good friend of Clarke's, was killed in an avalanche while attempting a summit. This was a turning point for Clarke. Stoltmann, already a noted conservationist and volunteer, had left a hole in the mountain community that Clarke stepped in to fill. He began his wilderness education efforts in memory of him.

In 1995, Clarke was the subject of a documentary called "Child of the Wind" by Canadian director and producer Bill Noble which won the Best film on Climbing at the 1995 Banff Mountain Film Festival.

In 1996, Clarke and Lisa Baile founded the Wilderness Education Program (WEP).

In 1997, Clarke, Chief Bill Williams (hereditary chief of the Squamish First Nation), and artist photographer Nancy Bleck founded the Uts'am Witness Project, providing an opportunity for city folk to reconnect with nature and to take part in a Coast Salish First Nations witness ceremony.

In 1998, because of his work and his knowledge of the Squamish First Nation Territory, Clarke was given the honor of being adopted into the nation, and was given the Coast Salish name "Xwexwsélkn" which means "mountain goat" (a reference to his shock of unruly, wooly white hair).

In July 2002, he became one of the few mountaineers in Canada to be inducted as a Member of the Order of Canada. He was also an honorary member of the Alpine Club of Canada and the British Columbia Mountaineering Club.

On January 23, 2003, Clarke died of a brain tumor, with his family at his side. He leaves wife Annette Clarke (née Lehnacker) and son Nicholas 'Skookum', as well as his parents Brigid and Kevin, his sister Cathaleen and his brother Kevin.

In 2012, Harbour Publishing released  the book John Clarke Explorer of the Coast Mountains written by Lisa Baile. In October 2013 a book about the Uts'am Witness Project which Clarke co-founded was published by Figure 1 Publishing. Picturing Transformation Nexw-áyantsut  features the photographic artwork of Nancy Bleck and was written Katherine Dodds with  Bleck and Chief Bill Williams.

Climbing accomplishments
This is a partial list of first ascents. Many of the peak names are suggested, links are to mountain IDs in the Canadian Mountain Encyclopedia. Where a sub peak is separated by more than 1 km from the main peak (and is unnamed) it is referred to by the main peak name, the compass point and distance from the main peak. For instance, Interesting Mountain has a sub-peak Interesting NE6 which is 6 km from the main summit at bearing 245 degrees.

 1967 Ossa Mountain West Ridge Picture of summit register
 1967 Manatee Peak
 1967 Oluk Peak
 1967 Dolphin Peak
 1967 Remora Peak
 1967 Gunsight Peak (In-SHUCK-ch Mountain)
 1967 Mermaid Peak
 1967 Albacore Peak
 1968 Tenas Peak
 1968 Tenas W1
 1968 Nivalis Mountain
 1968 Pelion Mountain NW Ridge
 1968 Pelion Mountain  NE Ridge
 1968 Amicus Mountain NE ridge
 1968 Amicus W1  
 1968 Ring Mountain
 1969 Lillooet Mountain Southeast Ridge
 1969 Porterhouse NE3
 1969 Porterhouse NE4
 1969 Moomin Peak
 1969 Tigger Peak
 1969 Channel Peak
 1969 Little Ring Mountain
 1969 Mt. Crerar - John Clarke, Barbara May Handford (Bernhardt) First Ascent
 1971 Whitemantle Mountain
 1971 Outlier Peak
 1971 Nebula Peak
 1971 Halkomelem Peak
 1971 Katzie Mountain
 1971 Stave Peak
 1971 Old Pierre Mountain
 1971 The Orphans
 1971 Nimbus Peak
 1971 Mount Abel
 1971 Adieu Mountain
 1971 Talon Peak
 1971 The Lecture Cutters
 1971 Piluk Peak
 1971 Carcajou Peak
 1971 Nannygoat Peak
 1971 Old Pierre Mountain 
 1971 Stalo Mountain
 1971 Comrade Peaks with large BCMC Party
 1971 Skakala Peak
 1971 Skayuk Peak
 1972 Mount Stanton solo
 1972 Stanton E5 from E, via Hidden Mtn
 1972 Abandoned Peak
 1972 Dunvegan Peak
 1972 Dunvegan N3
 1972 Limelite Peak
 1972 Ashlu Mountain West Ridge
 1972 Mount Doolittle
 1972 Doolittle E8
 1972 Mount Boardman
 1972 Elaho Mountain via West Ridge
 1972 Bottiger Peak
 1972 The Flames (Fire Spires)
 1972 Deserted Peak
 1972 Deserted N1
 1972 Royal Mountain
 1972 Hanging Peak South Face
 1972 Wahkash Peak
 1972 Nebula S1
 1972 Mount Athelstan Bridge-Lillooet Divide
 1972 Mount Ethelweard
 1972 Ethelweard S1
 1972 Mount Vanstone 
 1972 Mount Perkins
 1972 Mount Oswald
 1972 Oswald N2
 1972 Racoon Mountain
 1972 Totter Peak
 1972 Mittelberg Mountain
 1972 Mittelberg E3
 1972 Forger Peak 
 1972 Mount Whiting
 1972 Mount Ralph
 1972 Pebble Peak
 1972 Mount Pollock
 1972 Mount Clendenning
 1972 Corporal Mountain
 1972 Guthrum SW3
 1972 Thiassi SE3

 1973 Mount Chapman
 1973 Mount Heaney
 1973 Kolos Peak during his first visit to the Ha-iltzuk
 1973 Klisila Peak
 1973 Shaman Peaks
 1973 Wahshilas Peak
 1973 Klinaklini Peak
 1973 Hamatsa Peak
 1973 Doran Peak
 1973 Doran SE3
 1974 Serov Peak
 1974 Chimai Mountain
 1974 Mount Delilah
 1974 Sessel Mountain
 1974 Sessel NW1
 1974 Sessel E4
 1975 Bucklin Peak
 1975 Pointer Peak
 1976 Polacca Peak
 1976 Apple Peak (Peak 7539. Apple River Spires)
 1976 Shaker Peak
 1976 Shaker W6 W Ridge
 1976 Shaker SW5 N Ridge
 1976 Stafford Peak East Ridge
 1976 Hidden Mountain
 1976 Brig Peak
 1976 Brig SW4 from N
 1976 Clipper Peak NW Ridge
 1976 Success Mountain From the North
 1976 Success NE4
 1977 Little Toba Peak
 1977 Hunaechin Peak 
 1977 Blumlisalp Mountain
 1977 Beach Mountain
 1977 Breaker Peak
 1977 Blackfin Peak
 1977 Blackfin SE3 (Comber Peak)  
 1979 Sergeant Mountain
 1982 Charnaud Towers highest summit only
 1982 Montrose Peak
 1982 Cobham Peak
 1983 Mount Willoughby as part of a 29-day solo traverse of the Bella Coola area (Ha-iltzuk Icecap), including 8 days spent snowbound in a tent.
 1983 Mount Storry
 1984 Orford Tower
 1984 Berkshire Peak
 1984 Gravelines Peak
 1984 Assini Peak
 1984 Algard Peak
 1984 Needle Peaks (Stinging Needle)
 1984 Ironface Peak
 1984 Nolan Peak
 1984 Wiltshire Peak
 1984 Warwick Peak
 1984 Pillbox Peak
 1984 Barkshack Peak
 1984 Champion Mountain
 1984 Chusan Peak
 1984 Chusan SW3
 1984 Chusan SW5
 1984 Skwawka Peak
 1984 Brighton NE0
 1985 Martello Mountain the only first ascent in the Waddington Range
 1985 Interesting Mountain
 1985 Interesting N4
 1985 Interesting NE2
 1985 Interesting NE6
 1985 Klite Peak
 1985 Powell Head Peak
 1986 Larson Peak
 1986 Larson SE5
 1988 Mount Job
 1989 Rain Door Peak Northeast Ridge
 1989 Mount Pitt South face of North Peak
 1989 Mount Caspar First recorded ascent
 1990 Arabella Peak East Face
 1990 Mount Argyll
 1991 The Meager Obelisk
 1991 Benburb Peak Filer-Montrose Divide
 1991 Arabella S6 (Argyll E)
 1991 Snow Pillow Peak
 1992 The Witness
 1992 The Defendant Northwest Ridge
 1995 Stagoo SW12
 1995 Stagoo W4
 1995 Stagoo NW4
 1996 House Mountain 1st recorded ascent

Notes

References

External links
 Canadian Mountain Encyclopedia Coast Mountains entry
 Wilderness Education Program (WEP) which John helped found
 Pictures of John

1945 births
2003 deaths
Canadian mountain climbers
Members of the Order of Canada
Deaths from brain cancer in Canada